Chrysoesthia gaditella is a moth of the family Gelechiidae. It is found in Portugal, Spain and Algeria.

The wingspan is 8.5–9 mm.

The larvae feed on Atriplex halimus. They mine the leaves of their host plant.

References

Moths described in 1859
Chrysoesthia